Marmion Abbey is a Benedictine community of the Swiss-American Congregation in Aurora, Illinois. It was founded in 1933 from St. Meinrad Archabbey in Indiana.  The principal apostolate of the monks has been Marmion Academy, though a variety of work has been undertaken by them throughout the Fox Valley area and beyond, particularly their mission priory in Quetzaltenango, Guatemala, where they operate a minor seminary.

External links
Marmion Abbey

Churches in the Roman Catholic Diocese of Rockford
Benedictine monasteries in the United States

Christian organizations established in 1933
1933 establishments in Illinois